The Tour de Côte d'Ivoire-Tour de la Réconciliation is a cycling stage race held in the Ivory Coast. It was on the UCI Africa Tour from 2015 until 2018 as a 2.2 event.

Winners

References

Cycle races in Ivory Coast
Recurring sporting events established in 1953
UCI Africa Tour races